Cam Lâm  is a district (huyện) of Khánh Hòa province in the South Central Coast region of Vietnam. Its capital is Cam Đức, which is located on the national road 1A.

Divisions 
In addition to the capital township, the district also encompasses the following rural communes:  

 Cam An Bắc
 Cam An Nam
 Cam Hải Đông
 Cam Hải Tây
 Cam Hiệp Bắc
 Cam Hiệp Nam
 Cam Hòa
 Cam Phước Tây
 Cam Tân
 Cam Thành Bắc
 Sơn Tân
 Suối Cát
 Suối Tân

References 

Districts of Khánh Hòa province